Miguel Francisco Pereira (born 23 August 1975) is an Angolan former professional footballer who played as a forward. He also earned 11 caps with the Angola national team, scoring two goals. He represented Angola at the 1998 African Cup of Nations.

Career statistics
Scores and results list Angola's goal tally first, score column indicates score after each Pereira goal.

References

External links
 
 

Living people
1975 births
Angolan footballers
Association football forwards
Angola international footballers
1998 African Cup of Nations players
FC Schalke 04 players
FC St. Pauli players
TSV 1860 Munich II players
SG Wattenscheid 09 players
VfB Hüls players
Bundesliga players
2. Bundesliga players
Angolan expatriate footballers
Angolan expatriate sportspeople in Germany
Expatriate footballers in Germany